Patrick James Scanlan (6 September 1896 – 1 January 1977) was an Australian rules footballer who played with and coached South Melbourne and Footscray in the Victorian Football League (VFL).

Scanlan made his league debut in 1920 for South Melbourne and went on to play exactly 100 games for the club, captaining them from 1923 to 1926. In 1927 he moved to Footscray and was appointed captain-coach. He retired as a player after the 1928 season and went to Richmond to coach the seconds; the team won the premiership and he then returned South Melbourne as coach of the seniors for two seasons. Later on in the decade he would also coach North Melbourne but couldn't prevent them from finishing with two wooden spoons.

External links

Allthestats.com

1896 births
Sydney Swans players
Sydney Swans coaches
Western Bulldogs players
Western Bulldogs coaches
North Melbourne Football Club coaches
Leopold Football Club (MJFA) players
Australian rules footballers from Melbourne
1977 deaths
People from Albert Park, Victoria